Zalaegerszegi Torna Egylet Kosárlabda Klub now mostly known for sponsorship reasons as Zalakerámia ZTE is a professional basketball team from Zalaegerszeg, Hungary. ZTE currently plays in the Nemzeti Bajnokság I/A, the Hungarian top division. In its history the team has won four national championships – the last one in 2010 – and four national cups. Between 1994 till 1997 ZTE also played in Europe, in the Korać Cup.

Honours

Domestic competitions
Nemzeti Bajnokság I/A (National Championship of Hungary)
 Champions (4): 1987–88, 1989–90, 1991–92, 2009–10
 Runners-up (4): 1985–86, 1990–91, 1993–94, 1994–95
 Third place (5): 1983–84, 1992–93, 1996–97, 2008–09, 2016–17

Magyar Kupa (National Cup of Hungary)
 Winners (4): 1988, 1990, 1992, 2010

Current players

Season by season

 Remained in the league due to the resignation of other teams to play in the league.
 Cancelled due to the COVID-19 pandemic in Hungary.

References

Basketball teams in Hungary
Sport in Zalaegerszeg